The Stinson Reliant is a popular single-engine four- to five-seat high-wing monoplane manufactured by the Stinson Aircraft Division of the Aviation Manufacturing Corporation of Wayne, Michigan.

Design and development
The Reliant is a high-wing, fixed-tailwheel land monoplane powered with a variety of radial engines.

1,327 Reliants of all types were made from 1933 to 1941, in different models, from SR-1 to SR-10. The final commercial model, the Stinson Reliant SR-10, was introduced in 1938. A militarized version was first flown in February 1942 and remained in production through several additional versions (all externally identical) until late 1943 for the US and British armed forces.
 
Reliant production can be broken into two distinct types – the straight-wing Reliants (all models up to SR-6) and the gull-wing Reliants (all models from SR-7 and after, including the militarized V-77/AT-19), with there being little in common between the two groups of types. The straight-wing Reliant has a wing of constant chord and thickness which is supported by two struts each side with additional bracing struts. In contrast the taper-wing Reliant has the broadest chord and thickness of the wing at mid-span, with the outer wing trailing edge heavily angled forward and a rounded cutout on the leading edge root, all supported by a single strut. The taper wing has a significant step up between the fuselage and the wing, and the changes in wing thickness gave it a distinct gull appearance from the front.

Operational history

The Reliant was used by the United States Army Air Forces in World War II as a utility aircraft, designated UC-81, and as trainer designated AT-19. The Royal Navy and Royal Air Force also used Reliants, for light transport and communication duties. After the war they were sold on the civilian market as the Vultee V-77.

The V-77 is a spartan version of the SR-10 with the 300 hp Lycoming R680-E3B, a single door on the left side and the traditional "bump" cowl was replaced with a simpler smooth cowl. Internal structure was beefed up significantly over the commercial models, and a distinctive triangle-shaped counterbalance was added to the rudder.

Variants

The SR-10 Reliant was available as a landplane, seaplane and skidplane in the following configurations:

 Ambulance (two stretchers)
 Cargo/Ambulance
 Target Towing
 Firefighting
 Photographic

Civilian variants
SR Reliant: Powered by a  Lycoming R-680 radial piston engine.
SR-1: Powered by a  Lycoming R-680-2 radial piston engine. Two built.
SR-2: Powered by a 240-hp (179-kW) Lycoming R-680-7 radial piston engine.
SR-3: Similar to the SR-1, but with minor structural changes.
SR-4: Powered by a 250-hp (186-kW) Wright R-760-E radial piston engine.
SR-5: Improved version, powered by a 225-hp (168-kW) Lycoming R-680-4 radial piston engine.
SR-5A: Powered by a 245-hp (183-kW) Lycoming R-680-6 radial piston engine.
SR-5B: Powered by a 240-hp (179-kW) Lycoming R-680-2 radial piston engine.
SR-5C: Powered by a 260-hp (194-kW) Lycoming R-680-5 radial piston engine.
SR-5E: Powered by a 225-hp (168-kW) Lycoming R-680-4 radial piston engine.
SR-5F: Powered by a 250-hp (186-kW) Wright R-760-E radial piston engine.
SR-6: Four-seat cabin aircraft, powered by a Lycoming R-680-6 radial piston engine.
SR-6A: Four-seat cabin aircraft, powered by a 225-hp (168-kW) Lycoming R-680-4 radial piston engine.
SR-6B: Four-seat cabin aircraft, powered by a Lycoming R-680-5 radial piston engine.
SR-7: First gull wing series.
SR-7B: Four-seat cabin aircraft, powered by a Lycoming R-680-B6 radial piston engine. 47 built.
SR-7C: Four-seat cabin aircraft, powered by a Lycoming R-680-B5 radial piston engine. Three built.
SR-8A: Five-seat cabin aircraft.
SR-8B: Five-seat cabin aircraft, powered by a Lycoming R-680-B6 radial piston engine.
SR-8C: Five-seat cabin aircraft, powered by a Lycoming R-680-B5 radial piston engine.
SR-8D: Five-seat cabin aircraft, powered by a Wright R-760-E2 radial piston engine.
SR-8DM: Utility transport version of the SR-8D.
SR-8E: Five-seat cabin aircraft, powered by a 320-hp (239-kW) Wright R-760-E23 radial piston engine.
SR-8DE: Utility transport version of the SR-8E.
SR-9: 1937 series. Fitted with a curved windshield, unique to this series.
SR-9A: Proposed version with Lycoming R-680-B4 engine. Unbuilt.
SR-9B: Powered by a  Lycoming R-680-B6 engine. 35 built.
SR-9C: Powered by a  Lycoming R-680-B5 engine. 65 built.
SR-9D: Powered by a  Wright R-760-E1 engine. 22 built.
SR-9E: Powered by a  Wright R-760-E2 engine. 43 built.
SR-9F: Powered by a  Pratt & Whitney Wasp Junior radial engine. 34 built. 
SR-10

SR-10B: Powered by a Lycoming R-680-D6. One built.
SR-10C: Powered by a Lycoming R-680-D5 engine.  46 built.
SR-10D: Wright R-760E-1 engine. 3 built.
SR-10E: Powered by a Wright R-760E-2 radial piston engine. 21 built.
SR-10F: Powered by a Pratt & Whitney R-985 Wasp Junior SB radial piston engine. 18 built.
SR-10G: Powered by a Lycoming R-680-E1 radial piston engine. 12 built.
SR-10J: Lycoming R-680-E3 engine. 11 built.
SR-10K: Powered by a  Wright R-975E-3 radial engine. 2 built for New York City Police Department; one with conventional landing gear, one seaplane with Edo floats.

Military variants
AT-19
USAAF designation for a training variant of the UC-81 for the Royal Navy under Lend-Lease as the Reliant I, 500 built.
AT-19A
Original designation of the L-9A which was a Voyager not a Reliant.

AT-19B
Original designation of the L-9B which was a Voyager not a Reliant.
AT-19C
Conversions of AT-19s for photo-survey aircraft for the USAAF, 51 conversions.
UC-81
Four impressed SR.8Bs.
UC-81A
Two impressed SR.10Gs.
UC-81B
One impressed SR.8E.
UC-81C
Three impressed SR.9Cs.
XC-81D
One civil SR.10F operated by the military for the development of glider pick-up techniques.
UC-81E
Four impressed SR.9Fs.
UC-81F
Seven impressed SR.10Fs.
UC-81G
Three impressed SR.9Ds.
UC-81H
One impressed SR.10E.
UC-81J
Nine impressed SR.9Es.
UC-81K
Five impressed SR.10Cs.
UC-81L
Two impressed SR.8Cs.
UC-81M
One impressed SR.9EM.
UC-81N
Two impressed SR.9Bs.
L-12
Two SR.5As impressed into service with the USAAF during World War II.
L-12A
Two SR.7Bs impressed into service during World War II.
RQ-1
One SR-5 Reliant was acquired by the US Coast Guard in 1935, later redesignated XR3Q-1 and decommissioned in 1941.
XR3Q-1
One SR-5 Reliant was acquired by the US Navy in 1935.
Reliant I
500 Reliants were supplied to the Royal Navy under Lend-Lease. The Reliants were used for light transport and communications, navigation and radio training duties.

Operators

Military operators

Argentine Navy

Royal Australian Air Force – 1

 Royal Air Force
 No. 510 Squadron RAF
 Fleet Air Arm
 730 Naval Air Squadron
 748 Naval Air Squadron

 Uruguayan Air Force

 United States Army Air Forces – A total of 47 Reliants impressed during World War 2
 United States Coast Guard
 United States Navy

Civil operators

Aerolloyd Iguassu
Aerovias Minas Gerais
NAB – Navegação Aérea Brasileira

Grupo TACA

Aeronaves de México – the Reliant was the first aircraft used by Aeronaves, later to become Mexico's largest airline, Aeromexico, on their initial service between Mexico and Acapulco on 14 September 1934

Widerøe

 Líneas Aéreas de Transporte Nacional (LATN)

 New York City Police Department Aviation Unit
Northwest Airways

Specifications (SR-10F)

See also

References

Bibliography

External links

Stinson SR-10F Reliant National Air and Space Museum, Smithsonian Institution
Stinson UC-81 Reliant (Stinson AT-19/SR-10) Fleet Air Arm Archive
Stinson SR-9 Alberta Aviation Museum
(1944) T.O. No. 01-50KA-1 Pilot's Flight Operating Instructions for Army Model AT-19 Airplanes, British Model Reliant

1930s United States civil utility aircraft
1930s United States military utility aircraft
High-wing aircraft
Reliant
Single-engined tractor aircraft
Aircraft first flown in 1933